Kellond is an unincorporated community and former railroad station in Pushmataha County, Oklahoma, United States. Kellond is located approximately three miles northwest of Antlers on Oklahoma State Highway 2.

The school building had two classrooms separated by a hallway, a larger playroom, two entryways, a large storage room which was later updated into two restrooms, (before which there were two outhouses on the east side of the school) a large auditorium, and a basement which was used as a lunchroom and had a small kitchen, and various storage rooms.

The two classrooms were for first through fourth grades, known as the Little Room, and fifth through eighth grades, known as the Big Room.

In the early 1950s, the two teachers were Mrs. Bertha Lee Wheeler Smith, better known as Miss Bertha, and Mr. Lonnie D. Killian. Later, Mr. Charles Bolin of Finley, replaced Mr. Killian. Miss Bertha was the teacher for the Little Room and Messrs. Killian and Bolin were teachers for the Big Room.

The teacherage, a small frame house, sat to the north of the school. This is where Miss Bertha, her husband, Eanon, and daughter, Kathy, lived from 1953 until 1964.

There was a rock wall that surrounded the school, teacherage, and large playground on the west and north sides. The east and south sides were bordered by barbed wire fences that kept out the livestock, mostly Brahman cattle owned by Wren Shaw. A large creek ran the full length of the south side, which provided many recess activities such as catching crawdads.

History 

During the 1880s the St. Louis-San Francisco Railway, more popularly known as the “Frisco”, built a line from north to south through the Choctaw Nation, connecting Fort Smith, Arkansas with Paris, Texas. The railroad paralleled the Kiamichi River throughout much of its route in present-day Pushmataha County, Oklahoma. Train stations were established every few miles to aid in opening up the land and, more particularly, to serve as the locations of section houses. Supervisors for their respective miles of track lived in the section houses to administer the track and its right-of-way. These stations also served as points at which the trains could draw water.

The site of Kellond was selected because of its proximity to the Kiamichi River, with its abundant water supply. Adjacent station stops were established at Moyers, Oklahoma to the north, and Antlers, Oklahoma to the south.  By the early 1890s,  the stop was known as Davenport.  Named for Luda P. Davenport (1861-1924), a local resident and county judge, it was identified on maps as Davenport through the early 1900s (decade). The exact cause and date of its change of name to Kellond is unknown, and was not noted by the local press.

The sparsely-populated area, at that time known as Jack’s Fork County, a part of the Pushmataha District of the Choctaw Nation, in the Indian Territory, was home to Choctaw Indians who farmed or subsisted on the land.

Few roads or trails existed.  Transportation was provided by the Frisco Railroad, which offered six trains per day—three in each direction—until it closed to passenger traffic during the late 1950s. It continued freight operations until 1981, when it closed altogether and its rails were removed. The loss of passenger rail coincided with the construction of Oklahoma State Highway 2.

Near Kellond was a locally important low-water ford on the Kiamichi River known as Rodney Crossing.  The crossing obtained its name from Rodney Mountain, located to the north of the settlement.  It was also home to the short-lived post office and small community of Rodney, Oklahoma.

Davenport, and later Kellond, never developed as a commercial center.  Its most significant structure was, and continues to be, a handsome public school constructed of native stone as a Works Progress Administration (WPA) project during the Great Depression of the 1930s.  The school, closed for many years, has served a variety of purposes, most recently as a night club and residence.

More information on Kellond may be found in the Pushmataha County Historical Society.

References

Unincorporated communities in Oklahoma
Unincorporated communities in Pushmataha County, Oklahoma